The 2016 ICC Awards were the thirteenth edition of ICC Awards. The voting panel took into account players' performance between 14 September 2015 and 20 September 2016. The announcement of the ICC Test Team of the Year and ICC ODI Team of the Year, along with the winners of the men's individual ICC awards, was made on 21 December 2016. The ICC awards the Sir Garfield Sobers Trophy to the Cricketer of the Year, which is considered to be the most prestigious award in world cricket.

Award categories and winners

Individual awards

Men's awards

Women's awards

Other awards

ICC Teams of the Year

Men's teams

ICC Men's Test Team of the Year
Alastair Cook was selected as the captain of the Test Team of the Year, with Jonny Bairstow selected as the wicket-keeper. Other players are:

 David Warner
 Alastair Cook
 Kane Williamson
 Joe Root
 Adam Voges
 Jonny Bairstow
 Ben Stokes
 Ravichandran Ashwin
 Rangana Herath
 Mitchell Starc
 Dale Steyn
 Steve Smith (12th man)

 ICC Men's ODI Team of the Year
Virat Kohli was selected as the captain of the ODI Team of the Year, with Quinton de Kock selected as the wicket-keeper. Other players are:

 David Warner
 Quinton de Kock
 Rohit Sharma
 Virat Kohli
 AB de Villiers
 Jos Buttler
 Mitchell Marsh
 Ravindra Jadeja
 Mitchell Starc
 Kagiso Rabada
 Sunil Narine
 Imran Tahir (12th man)

Women's teams
ICC Women’s Team of the Year
Stafanie Taylor was selected as the captain of the Women's Team of the Year, with Rachel Priest selected as the wicket-keeper. Other players are:

 Suzie Bates
 Rachel Priest
 Smriti Mandhana
 Stafanie Taylor
 Meg Lanning
 Ellyse Perry
 Heather Knight
 Deandra Dottin
 Sune Luus
 Anya Shrubsole
 Leigh Kasperek
 Kim Garth (12th woman)

See also

 International Cricket Council
 ICC Awards
 Sir Garfield Sobers Trophy (Cricketer of the Year)
 ICC Test Player of the Year
 ICC ODI Player of the Year
 David Shepherd Trophy (Umpire of the Year)
 ICC Women's Cricketer of the Year
 ICC Test Team of the Year
 ICC ODI Team of the Year

References

International Cricket Council awards and rankings
Crick
ICC Awards